Valentīna Gotovska (born 3 September 1965 in Krāslava) is a retired Latvian long jumper.

Her personal best jump is 6.91 metres, achieved in June 2000 in Tartu. In her earlier career she was a high jumper, with a personal best of 1.97 metres from 1990. Gotovska retired after the 2005 season.

Achievements

External links

1965 births
Living people
People from Krāslava
Soviet female high jumpers
Latvian female long jumpers
Latvian female high jumpers
Athletes (track and field) at the 1992 Summer Olympics
Athletes (track and field) at the 1996 Summer Olympics
Athletes (track and field) at the 2000 Summer Olympics
Athletes (track and field) at the 2004 Summer Olympics
Olympic athletes of Latvia
World Athletics Championships athletes for Latvia
Competitors at the 1994 Goodwill Games